The Japanese martial art Judo was first introduced in the Algeria in the 19th century, during the colonization period by France.

See also 
Judo by country

References

External links 
 Ligue d'Alger de judo